The American Negro Exposition, also known as the Black World's Fair and the Diamond Jubilee Exposition, was a world's fair held in Chicago from July until September in 1940, to celebrate the 75th anniversary (also known as a diamond jubilee) of the end of slavery in the United States at the conclusion of the Civil War in 1865.

History 
As a result of the discrimination towards African Americans at the 1933 Century of Progress Exposition, James Washington, a real estate developer, conceived of the American Negro Exposition.

On July 4, 1940, President Franklin Delano Roosevelt, from his Hyde Park home, pressed a button to turn on the lights, officially opening the American Negro Exposition. The main speakers on the opening day were Chicago mayor Edward Joseph Kelly as well as Postmaster General James A. Farley. The exposition was held at the Chicago Coliseum, with 120 exhibits on display. The exposition was organized by James W. Washington, as president, and was funded through two $75,000 ($1.37 million in 2020) grants from Congress and the Illinois General Assembly. Truman Gibson, a member of Roosevelt's "Black Cabinet", served as executive director for the fair.

Exhibits 
Entrance was 25 cents and the organizers expected 2 million people to attend. The art exhibit comprised 300 paintings and drawings and was called by The New York Times as "the largest showing of the work of Negro artists ever assembled." 

Additionally, there was a Hall of Fame honoring notable African Americans. Artist William Edouard Scott created a series of 24 murals for the event, which took him three months to complete. Black Mexican artist Elizabeth Catlett's master thesis, the limestone sculpture "Negro Mother and Child" won first place in the exposition. 

Margaret Walker entered a literary competition with the following verses:

Arna Bontemps and Langston Hughes co-wrote a musical titled Jubilee: Cavalcade of the Negro Theater specifically for the exposition. Bontemps, the poet Fenton Johnson, and several others working under the auspices of the Illinois Writers’ Project, produced a commemorative 96-page African-American history book called Cavalcade of the American Negro. 

Other musical segments were a performance by Duke Ellington and his orchestra, as well as a swing performance of The Chimes of Normandy.

Participants

Organizations

Businesses

Dioramas 
The exhibit had 33 five-feet wide dioramas held in the "Court of Dioramas" hall, they were made from wood, plaster and masonite, showcasing African American contributions and events of historical significance, ranging from ancient Egypt through World War I. Commercial artist Charles C. Dawson directed the creation of the dioramas. The temporary exhibit was only on display for the roughly two months the exhibition ran and inspired local teachers in improving teaching African American history.

A list of the dioramas in the names at the time of showing, included:

Of the original 33 dioramas, 13 of them were lost and Tuskegee University, through Dawson, an alumni who was started teaching at the institution, acquired the remaining 20 dioramas from the State of Illinois. They were placed at the University's old George Washington Carver Museum, then moved to the main library. Due to their state of disrepair, they had arrived at Tuskegee at "60% destroyed", they were stored away from public view for decades.

Tuskegee's Legacy Museum set up a new exhibit, "20 Dioramas: Brightly-Lit Windows, Magically Different", using the twenty dioramas to "demonstrate the rich past of African-Americans". The museum curator, Dr. Jontyle Robinson, used the conservation work to "improve diversity in the field of conservation", since "[o]nly 1 to 2% of conservators are African American." Restoring a single diorama costs between $25,000 to $30,000 in 2018.

CBS Sunday Morning correspondent Rita Braver did a story on the dioramas, with the intention of bringing awareness and hope that the segment would help in unearthing the lost 13.

Legacy 
In 2015, the African American Cultural Center of the University of Illinois at Chicago curated an exhibition of the Exposition "showcas[ing]...objects, images and texts from the landmark...Exposition."

See also 

 The Exhibit of American Negroes-sociological display within the Palace of Social Economy at the 1900 World's Fair in Paris.

References

Notes 
 1.Not including the 230 "Negro Newspapers".

External links 
 Official Program of the 1940 American Negro Exposition
 Official program and guidebook-hosted by the Internet Archive.
 Cavalcade of the American Negro-Information hosted by the Library of Congress on a book of the same name produced by the Illinois Writers' Project of the WPA, which became "one of the more important contributions" and "includes a useful description of all the exhibits at the exposition."

1940 festivals
1940 in Illinois
African-American festivals
African-American history between emancipation and the civil rights movement
World's fairs in Chicago
American Civil War anniversaries
African-American history in Chicago